The Standard Life Building is a historic high-rise building in Jackson, Mississippi, USA. It was designed in the Art Deco architectural style, and it was completed in 1929. It is the fourth tallest building in Jackson.

References

Buildings and structures in Jackson, Mississippi
Residential buildings completed in 1929
Art Deco architecture in Mississippi
Residential skyscrapers in Mississippi
Skyscrapers in Jackson, Mississippi